The 2016–17 season of Romania's top level women's football league was the fourth under the new name Superliga. It is the 27th season of top-level football and will decide the Romanian champions and UEFA Women's Champions League participant.

Olimpia Cluj were the defending champions.

Team changes

To Liga I
Promoted from Liga II
 CSS Târgovişte (winner of 2015–16 Liga II, Seria I)
 CFR Timișoara (winner of 2015–16 Liga II, Seria II)

From Liga I
none

Stadiums by capacity and location

League table

External links
 Official site
 Season on soccerway.com

Rom
Fem
Romanian Superliga (women's football) seasons